Elections for the City of Westminster London borough were held on 6 May 2010. The 2010 general election and other local elections took place on the same day.

In London council elections the entire council is elected every four years, as opposed to some local elections, in which one councillor is elected every year for three of the four years.

The Conservatives retained control of the council, and all wards continued with the same party representation as at the previous borough election in 2006. Labour won back the Church Street seat they had lost to the Conservatives at a 2008 by-election.

Summary of results

References

Council,2010
Westminster
Westminster City Council election
Election, 2010
2010s in the City of Westminster